NEX or Nex may refer to:

 Nex, Singapore, a shopping mall in Serangoon, Singapore
 Nex Entertainment, a Japanese video game developer
 NEX Group, a UK-based financial services firm
 NEX Stock Exchange, a defunct stock exchange from Montenegro
 Generation NEX, a Nintendo video game clone
 Narita Express (N'EX), a Japanese train service
 Navy Exchange or base exchange, the US Navy retail store chain
 Pepsi NEX, a variation of Pepsi
 Sony NEX (New E-mount eXperience), a trading name of the Sony E-mount system

People
 Christiane Nex

See also
 
 Nexus (disambiguation)
 Next (disambiguation)